The Golden Orange apple is an apple cultivar that was first developed in Italy in the 1970s (released 1996) by crossing PRI 1956-6 and Ed Gould Golden apples. 

Some properties include a resistance to scab, moderate vigor, medium-late blooming season, moderately large size, symmetry, lack of russeting, ripening period longer than that of Golden Delicious, and long storage ability.

External links
Picture (Picasa Albums Web)

References

Apple cultivars
Italian apples